Lucy Dathan is an American politician who serves as a member of the Connecticut House of Representatives from the 142nd district, comprising parts of New Canaan and Norwalk. She was born in St. Louis, Missouri, and has 3 children.

Career
Dathan, a Democrat affiliated with the Working Families Party, ousted incumbent Republican Fred Wilms in the 2018 Connecticut elections to become the first Democrat to win election in the 142nd House District. She defeated Wilms with 5,991 votes, or 54.5% of the total vote. Wilms received 4,994 votes, or 45.5%.

References

Living people
Date of birth missing (living people)
Politicians from St. Louis
Democratic Party members of the Connecticut House of Representatives
Working Families Party politicians
Women state legislators in Connecticut
Year of birth missing (living people)
21st-century American politicians
21st-century American women politicians